"Time and Time Again" is the second single from the rock band Papa Roach's third studio album, Lovehatetragedy.

Music video
The music video (directed by Samuel Bayer) shows the band driving black cars in a street race with the song playing on the car stereos. Sections of this video were used in the Papa Roach version of the Pepsi Blue television advertisements in 2002.

A second version was also made, known as the UK version. It shows the band driving around, and playing concerts on the street of Sacramento, California while the cops are hunting them down. Locations showcased including César Chávez Park, the Globe Mills and the Rainbow Bridge in Folsom, California.

Track listing

Chart performance

References

Papa Roach songs
2002 singles
Music videos directed by Samuel Bayer
2002 songs
Songs written by Jacoby Shaddix
Song recordings produced by Brendan O'Brien (record producer)
DreamWorks Records singles
Songs written by Tobin Esperance